<mapframe
text="Fena Lake"
width=145 	
height= 290	
zoom= 14
latitude=13.353842
longitude=144.700058/>
Guam is made up of islands in the Pacific Ocean just south of the Mariana Islands: it is a territory of the United States. Cocos Island is an island 1 mile (1.6 km) off the southern tip of the United States territory of Guam and is considered part of Guam. Other islands in the Guam island chain are: Fofos, Cabras, As-Gadao and Agrigan. Fresh water in Guam is found in many marshy areas or ponds, and one large Fena Lake reservoir.

Lakes and reservoirs
Cocos Lagoon
Fena Reservoir

Ponds swamps and marshes
Agana Swamp
Assupian Pond
Lost Pond
LeoPalace Pond 52M
Route 4 Marsh

See also
List of rivers of Guam

References

Lakes
Guam
 
Guam
Lakes
Guam